The New Zealand National Science Fiction Convention is a volunteer-run science fiction convention that is scheduled annually, and usually takes place either at Easter or at Queen's Birthday weekend (end of May/early June).  It is usually abbreviated as NatCon.

New Zealand's premier science fiction award, the Sir Julius Vogel Award, is presented each year at the national convention.

Unlike the case with many other countries' national conventions, each convention is run by a different committee, unaffiliated with any national fannish body.  Bids for running the NatCons are voted on by attendees at the NatCon two years ahead.  These votes are organised by the current NatCon committee in liaison with the Science Fiction and Fantasy Association of New Zealand.

In the early years of the national convention, the four main cities (Auckland, Wellington, Christchurch, and Dunedin) all held the NatCon, but in recent years, the conventions have mostly been held in one of the two largest cities, Wellington and Auckland, both in the North Island.

List of New Zealand National Science Fiction Conventions 

Note: in this list, websites whose addresses end in sf.org.nz are, in most cases, mirrors of the original websites, some of which have been removed.

The issue of 1985 

In the late 1970s and early 1980s, some convention bids were made only a year in advance. At Norcon II in 1984 there was no bid by any group to hold a national convention in 1985. One reason for this was an assumption that many New Zealanders would instead attend Aussiecon II, the 1985 Worldcon, in Melbourne, Australia. However, a group from Dunedin at Norcon II announced that it was willing to stage a national convention in 1986, and won the bid for that year's convention. It was then taken for granted that Halleycon in 1986 would be the next national convention - New Zealand's seventh.

A few months after Norcon II, a group of Auckland fans decided to stage Orcon at Easter in 1985 and in their publicity called it the seventh national convention. A few weeks prior to Easter 1985 the Halleycon committee contacted the Orcon committee and made it clear to them that they had no right to call it a national convention. The Orcon committee accepted this - however by that point the convention programme booklet had already been printed which stated it was the seventh national convention.  All of Halleycon's progress reports and publicity stated that it was the seventh national convention, and numbering of national conventions has continued from this, with the 1987 convention being officially the eighth New Zealand national convention.

Other New Zealand science fiction conventions 

There are occasionally other science fiction conventions held in New Zealand between national conventions. They were particularly common during the 1980s, when they were used by national convention organising committees for fundraising and as a means for testing their convention organisation. As such, they often took place in the same centres as the following year's national convention.

Other New Zealand events related to science fiction 

The Armageddon Expo, an event held annually in several New Zealand cities, is a more commercially orientated event. It is mostly made up of comic, toy, video game and DVD stalls, run by local businesses.

External links 
 – New Zealand Science Fiction Index

Science fiction conventions in New Zealand